Frank Pooler (October 23, 1847 – March 18, 1900) was an American businessman and politician.

Biography
Frank Pooler was born in Winslow, Maine on October 23, 1847. He moved to Onalaska, Wisconsin and was involved in the lumber business. He moved to Clarksville, Missouri and lived there for two years before returning to Onalaska. He was also president of a railway company.

He married Frances Cornelia Nichols on January 6, 1870, and they had four children.

He served in the Wisconsin State Assembly in 1882, as a Republican. He also served on the La Crosse County, Wisconsin Board of Supervisors, as county treasurer, and mayor of Onalaska, Wisconsin.

He died in Savanna, Illinois of a stroke on March 18, 1900, while visiting some friends.

Notes

External links

1846 births
1900 deaths
People from Winslow, Maine
People from Pike County, Missouri
People from Onalaska, Wisconsin
Businesspeople from Wisconsin
County officials in Wisconsin
County supervisors in Wisconsin
Mayors of places in Wisconsin
19th-century American politicians
19th-century American businesspeople
Republican Party members of the Wisconsin State Assembly